In enzymology, a linoleoyl-CoA desaturase (also Delta 6 desaturase) is an enzyme that converts between types of fatty acids, which are essential nutrients in the human body. The enzyme mainly catalyzes the chemical reaction

linoleoyl-CoA + AH2 + O2  gamma-linolenoyl-CoA + A + 2 H2O

The 3 substrates of this enzyme are linoleoyl-CoA, an electron acceptor AH2, and O2, whereas its 3 products are gamma-linolenoyl-CoA, the reduction product A, and H2O.

This enzyme belongs to the family of oxidoreductases, specifically those acting on paired donors, with O2 as oxidant and incorporation or reduction of oxygen. The oxygen incorporated need not be derived from O2 with oxidation of a pair of donors resulting in the reduction of O to two molecules of water.  The systematic name of this enzyme class is linoleoyl-CoA,hydrogen-donor:oxygen oxidoreductase. Other names in common use include Delta6-desaturase (D6D or Δ-6-desaturase), Delta6-fatty acyl-CoA desaturase, Delta6-acyl CoA desaturase, fatty acid Delta6-desaturase, fatty acid 6-desaturase, linoleate desaturase, linoleic desaturase, linoleic acid desaturase, linoleoyl CoA desaturase, linoleoyl-coenzyme A desaturase, and long-chain fatty acid Delta6-desaturase.  This enzyme participates in linoleic acid metabolism.  It employs one cofactor, iron.

The enzyme is molecularly identical across all living things (preserved across Kingdom (biology)) it is present in animals, plants, and cyanobacteria.

D6D is one of the 3 fatty acid desaturases present in humans along with Δ-5 and Δ-9, named so because it was thought to desaturate bond between carbons 6 and 7, counting from carboxyl group (with the carboxyl group carbon numbered one). The number 6 in the name of the enzyme has nothing to do with omega-6 fatty acids. In humans, it is encoded by the FADS2 gene.

Molecular activity
D6D is a desaturase enzyme, i.e. introduces a double bond in a specific position of long-chain fatty acids.  Among them, it converts between various forms of Omega-3 and Omega-6 fatty acids:
 primarily (in humans):
 cis-linoleic acid to gamma-linolenic acid (GLA)
 Palmitic acid to Sapienic acid
 less efficiently in humans:
 ALA to Stearidonic acid, along with an elongase to provide EPA. 
 Tetracosatetranoic acid to tetracosapentanoic acid, an intermediate step between EPA to DHA synthesis.

D6D is obligatory along with various elongases to convert to longer chain omega-3's, such as between ALA to EPA as well as EPA to DHA.

GLA deficiencies in animals including humans have shown wide effects down the line -- Dihomogamma-linolenic acid (DGLA) and Prostaglandin E1 deficiency.  PGE1 activates T lymphocytes, inhibits smooth muscle proliferation and thrombosis, is important in gonadal function and raises cyclic AMP levels in many tissues. It also affects viability of sperm. and dermatitis.

Variability
6D is a long chain PUFA rate limiter, has greater affinity for ALA than for linoleic acid, nevertheless many diets have far more linoleic acid present, resulting in reduced levels of alpha-Linolenic acid to EPA conversion.  Women tend to have higher levels of D6D due to the effects of estrogen .

Inhibiting factors
 alcohol, radiation, diabetes

Agonists
 Moderate food restriction (up to 300%)
 Low levels of Omega-3's.

Technical reading
 EctoGEM: 1.14.19.3-RXN

Toxoplasma gondii 
Felines lack D6D activity in their guts and accumulate systemic linoleic acid. This increase in linoleic acid in cats has an influence in causing the sexual cycle of T. gondii to be restricted to felines, with linoleic acid stimulating T. gondii sexual reproduction.

References

 

EC 1.14.19
Iron enzymes
Enzymes of unknown structure